Guillemont Barracks, located just off of junction 4a of the M3, on the Minley Road (A327), was a military installation at Minley in Hampshire.

History
The barracks were built in 1938. Covering 13.7ha, they were named after the German-held village of Guillemont, which was retaken by British Empire Forces, in September 1916, during the Battle of the Somme. The West Nova Scotia Regiment arrived at the barracks on 1 January 1940, and the Les Fusiliers Mont-Royal, part of the Canadian 5th Brigade, were stationed at the barracks in late 1940. King George VI and Queen Elizabeth inspected the troops on 26 March 1941. The 3rd Training Regiment of the Royal Engineers were based there from 1954 until the early 1960s. It then became the home of the 1st Battalion the Parachute Regiment between 1963 and 1965.

The site was purchased by Sun Microsystems in 1997 for £36 million. After Sun Microsystems moved to Reading, the property developer, Landid, bought the site in January 2011. In December 2013, a planning application to demolish the part built structures and to build 150 homes on the site was refused.

References

Barracks in England